Commencement Day is a 1924 short silent comedy film directed by Robert F. McGowan. It was the 25th Our Gang short subject released.

Plot
Mickey gets in a fight with another boy over Mary. The parents show up for Commencement Day at school and listen to the kids recite and play their musical instruments. Jackie puts pepper in Joe's saxophone. Mickey loses his frog. Farina falls in a well. While the parents are out rescuing Farina, the kids get in a food fight.

Production notes
When the silent Pathé Our Gang comedies were syndicated for television as "The Mischief Makers" in 1960, Commencement Day was retitled Little Red Schoolhouse. This film was also made available for the 16mm home movie market as Graduation Day.

Cast

The Gang
 Joe Cobb as Joe
 Jackie Condon as Jackie
 Mickey Daniels as Mickey
 Allen Hoskins as Farina
 Mary Kornman as Mary
 Ernie Morrison as Sunshine Sammy
 Jannie Hoskins as Mango
 Dinah the Mule as herself

Additional cast
 Gabe Saienz as Snoozer, the bully
 Andy Samuel as Andy
 George B. French as school teacher
 Helen Gilmore as Joe's mother
 Gus Leonard as Parent with ear-horn
 Lyle Tayo as Mary's mother
 Dorothy Vernon as Mickey's mother
 Charley Young as Parent

See also
 Our Gang filmography

References

External links

1924 films
American silent short films
American black-and-white films
Films directed by Robert F. McGowan
Hal Roach Studios short films
1924 comedy films
Our Gang films
1924 short films
1920s American films
Silent American comedy films